USS Remora (SS-487), a , was the only ship of the United States Navy to be named for the remora, a fish with a suctorial disk on its head enabling it to cling to other fish and to ships.

Construction and commissioning
Remora′s keel was laid down on 5 March 1945 by the Portsmouth Navy Yard in Kittery, Maine. She was launched on 12 July 1945, sponsored by Mrs. T. W. Samuels III, and commissioned on 3 January 1946 with Commander Robert Sellars in command.

Service history

Training submarine
Completing her Caribbean Sea shakedown in April 1946, Remora operated out of New London, Connecticut, as a training submarine until January 1947. Then transferred to the Pacific, she transited the Panama Canal at mid-month and arrived at Mare Island, Vallejo, California, on 14 February to begin a Greater Underwater Propulsive Power Program (GUPPY-II) conversion. Early in November, she completed trials and on 22 February arrived at San Diego, California, her new homeport.

Eastern Pacific
For the next two years, she remained in the eastern Pacific operating primarily off California, but during the summer and early fall of 1948, ranged as far north as the Aleutian Islands. On 1 May 1950 she headed west for her first deployment in the Far East. On 8 June she arrived at Sasebo, and on 11 June she shifted to Yokosuka, from which base she conducted anti-submarine warfare (ASW) training exercises with units of Naval Forces Far East. Two weeks later the Korean War began.

A unit of TF 96, Naval Forces Japan Remora patrolled Soya Strait, between Hokkaidō and Sakhalin in late July and early August. Later in the month, she headed back to San Diego. During the next two years she underwent overhaul, provided services for the Line School at Monterey, California, and conducted local training exercises. She returned to the western Pacific in early 1953. Arriving at Buckner Bay on 15 March, she continued on to Japan in April and at mid-month rejoined TF 96. In June she was back in Okinawan waters for patrols and exercises, after which she returned to Yokosuka. On 2 July she headed east, reaching San Diego on 3 August.

After the fighting in Korea ended, Remora remained based at San Diego and through the decade continued to alternate training exercises and patrols in the western Pacific with similar First Fleet operations off the United States West Coast and in Hawaiian waters. She remained in the eastern Pacific during 1956 and 1958, but, during the spring of the latter year, was engaged in extended exercises off Alaska.

Pearl Harbor
In November 1961, Remora was transferred from San Diego to Pearl Harbor. Then, in 1963, she was employed to evaluate antisubmarine sonar in Hawaiian waters. In May 1964, she resumed a schedule of annual six-month WestPac deployments which she continued into 1969. Remora was one of the last diesel boats to receive the Navy Unit Commendation for "Meritorious Service for operations during the Summer and Fall of 1967." During a shipyard overhaul in late 1967 early 1968, Engine #1 was removed and replaced with a "Prairie Masker" system designed to mask her engines during snorkeling.

In July 1969, Remora shifted home ports, from Pearl Harbor to Charleston, South Carolina. With the exception of one Mediterranean Sea cruise, from 16 February to 26 June 1970, she continued to operate out of Charleston, along the Atlantic seaboard, in the Caribbean Sea, and in the Gulf of Mexico, until decommissioned 29 October 1973 at Charleston.

Greek service

After decommissioning from US Navy in 1973, she was transferred to the Hellenic Navy as a sale, and recommissioned Katsonis (S-115). She served until 31 March 1993, when she was decommissioned.

References

External links
 Photo gallery at navsource.org

Tench-class submarines
Ships built in Kittery, Maine
1945 ships
World War II submarines of the United States
Cold War submarines of the United States
Korean War submarines of the United States
Tench-class submarines of the Hellenic Navy